The Mixed Men is a fix-up novel  of science fiction short stories by Canadian-American writer A. E. van Vogt that focus on the mixed offspring of Dellian Supermen and human beings. The novel's title is taken from van Vogt's 1945 Astounding SF short story "Mixed Men", which was nominated for a Retro-Hugo Award in 1996. The stories published in the novel were originally released between the years of 1943 to 1945 in Astounding SF, with the novel being first published in a 5,000 copy printing in 1952 by Gnome Press and a 1955 Berkley Books edition under the title Mission to the Stars.

The novel is an early example of "fix-up" literature where several stories are re-written to make one cohesive novel.

Contents

 "Concealment"
 "The Storm"
 "The Mixed Men"
 "Lost: Fifty Suns"
 "Is it true?"

Reception
Reception for the novel was negative, with a 1952 reviewer for the New York Times calling it a "bad parody" of science fiction and high adventure. P. Schuyler Miller in Astounding Science Fiction (1952) found the novel to be "distinctly minor van Vogt" and that the protagonist "isn't very convincing." Author Bob Shaw later cited that one of the stories in the novel sparked his interest in the science fiction genre, stating that the "reading of that first story changed the entire course of my life".

References

Further reading

External links 
 

1952 short story collections
Short story collections by A. E. van Vogt
Gnome Press books